Bichunmoo is a 2000 South Korean martial arts fantasy drama film written and directed by Kim Young-jun and featuring Shin Hyun-joon, Kim Hee-sun, and Jung Jin-young. At the time of its release, it was the most expensive film in Korean history (it was supplanted in 2001 by Musa).

Plot
In 12th-century China, during Mongol rule, childhood sweethearts Jinha and Sullie are separated but vow to reunite. Orphan Jinha begins training in the Bichun martial arts and discovers his father was a swordsman murdered by the Mongol army. Meanwhile, Sullie's father, a Mongol general, arranges for her to marry a Mongol noble. Believing Jinha to be dead, Sullie marries the noble. Recovering from near-death, Jinha takes on the persona of bandit Jahalang, and begins an anti-Mongol crusade with the help of his army of warriors. Finally Jin-ha and Sullie are re-united, when Jinha's bandit warriors infiltrate Sullie's family manor.

Cast
Shin Hyun-joon as Yu Jinha
Kim Hee-sun as Sullie
Jung Jin-young as Namgung Junkwang
Jang Dong-Jik as Lai
Choi Yoo-jung as Yeojin
Gi Ju-bong as Kwakjung
Bang Hyep as Namgung Sung
Kim Hak-cheol  as Taruga
Kim Soo-ro as Ashin
Lee Han-gal as Changryun
Seo Tae-hwa as Saijune

Production
Bichunmoo was shot entirely in China, with a Hong Kong-based martial arts director.

Criticism

In spite of its financial success, the film was heavily criticized on its initial release in Korea, primarily due to its alleged disloyalty to the comic book on which it was based. Another argument given against the film was the casting choice of Kim Hee-sun, who was perceived as being too modern for a period swordplay film.

Reception
Alan Morrison of Empire called Bichunmoo a "Top-notch martial arts action".

References

External links

South Korean fantasy drama films
South Korean martial arts films
Films shot in China
2000s South Korean films